Pialligo Parish is a parish of Murray County, New South Wales, a cadastral unit for use on land titles. It is now a very tiny piece of land to the north-east of the Australian Capital Territory after most of the land in the parish was transferred to the ACT in 1911. It once included the area to the east of Mount Ainslie and the north of the Molonglo River, including Mount Majura and what is now Canberra Airport, and the suburb of Pialligo.

References
Map showing proposed Federal Capital Territory and tenures of land within same, Charles Robt. Scrivener, 22 May 1909

Parishes of Canberra
Parishes of Murray County